Christian Era Broadcasting Service International, Inc. (CEBSI) (known as Christian Broadcasting Service from 1969 to 1994 and Christian Era Broadcasting Service Inc., from 1994 to 2014) is a Philippine television and radio network, and a religious broadcast arm of Iglesia Ni Cristo. These station studios are located in Quezon City. According to The Manila Times, CEBSI operates 3 channels on Philippine cable television, these include INCTV 48 and NET 25.

It is a sister company of the Eagle Broadcasting Corporation, which owns Net 25, DZEC Radyo Agila 1062 AM and Eagle FM 95.5. Currently, its flagship television station, DZCE-UHF TV Channel 48 (INC TV) in Metro Manila.

History 
CEBSI was formed by the Iglesia Ni Cristo in 1969 as its media arm and launched the Church's own radio station, DZEM, that same year. It is the Church's official media outfit, with its primary mission being evangelization via radio, television, and the current trends of the Internet and social media.

CEBSI is also the producer of the Iglesia ni Cristo's television programming, which began in 1983, and with the success of its first-ever television movie in 2017, spun off a film production house, CEBSI Films, in 2018.

Digital Television

With its partnership with the Japanese government through the Ministry of Internal Affairs and Communications (MIC), Digital Broadcasting Experts Group (DiBEG) and the Association of Radio Industries and Businesses (ARIB) in Japan.

It has developed a strong partnership with NET 25, the television station of Eagle Broadcasting Corporation in the digital transmission of the network's HD content.

Franchise renewal
On December 7, 2015, House Bill No. 5226 was approved by the House of Representatives and by the Senate of the Philippines to extend CEBSI's legislative franchise. On May 3, 2016, President Benigno Aquino III signed Republic Act No. 10772 which renewed CEBSI's license for another 25 years. The law grants CEBSI a franchise to construct, install, establish, operate and maintain for religious, noncommercial and nonprofit purposes and in the public interest, radio and/or television broadcasting stations, including digital television system, with the corresponding facilities such as relay stations, throughout the Philippines.

CEBSI stations

Analog

Digital

Radio stations

References

External links
INCMedia.org
INCTV website
INCRadio website

Christian radio stations in the Philippines
Iglesia ni Cristo
Television networks in the Philippines
Television in Metro Manila
Mass media companies established in 1969
Television channels and stations established in 2005
Philippine companies established in 1969
Religious television stations in the Philippines